Presbytherium is an extinct pantodont which existed in what is now Alberta, Canada, during the Paleocene period. It was first named by Craig S. Scott in 2010.

References

Fossils of Canada
Pantodonts
Fossil taxa described in 2010
Paleontology in Alberta
Prehistoric mammal genera